National Tertiary Route 623, or just Route 623 (or ) is a National Road Route of Costa Rica, located in the Guanacaste, Puntarenas provinces.

Description
In Guanacaste province the route covers Nandayure canton (San Pablo, Bejuco districts).

In Puntarenas province the route covers Puntarenas canton (Lepanto district).

References

Highways in Costa Rica